Amir Aguid (born 26 September 1992) is an Algerian footballer who plays for CR Témouchent as a defender.

References

External links

Amir Aguid at Footballdatabase

1992 births
Living people
Association football defenders
Algerian footballers
WA Tlemcen players
MO Béjaïa players
MC Oran players
JSM Skikda players
21st-century Algerian people